Kathleen Camille Lind (born February 15, 1994) is an American professional soccer defender who plays for Houston Dash in the National Women's Soccer League (NWSL). She played collegiate soccer for the University of Notre Dame.

Club career

Youth career
Lind played for Chicago Sockers FC during her youth, and played for Notre Dame Fighting Irish in Atlantic Coast Conference, during her college years. In 2012, Lind was named to NSCAA All-Northeast Region Second Team; All-BIG EAST Third Team; BIG EAST All-Rookie Team; and was also named Notre Dame Team Most Valuable Freshman.

Beginning in 2013, Lind captained the Notre Dame Soccer Team, making her the first Notre Dame three-year captain. The following year, she was named to several honorary teams: All-ACC Second Team; First Team NSCAA Scholar All-North/Central Region; Third Team NSCAA Scholar All-American; NSCAA Second Team All-Southeast Region. Lind also received Notre Dame OSCARS Francis Patrick O'Connor Award.

Chicago Red Stars, 2016–2019
Lind was selected by Chicago Red Stars as the nineteenth selection in second round in 2016 NWSL College Draft. She scored her first career NWSL goal on June 24, 2018, in a 2–0 win over the Utah Royals FC.

Loan to Adelaide United
In October 2016, Lind was loaned to Australian club Adelaide United along with her teammates Danielle Colaprico and Sofia Huerta. Lind re-signed with the club in October 2017, along with her teammates Danielle Colaprico and Alyssa Mautz.

Loan to Perth Glory
Lind signed with Australian club Perth Glory for the 2018–19 W-League Season, along with Red Stars team-mates Sam Kerr, Alyssa Mautz and Nikki Stanton.

Houston Dash, 2020–
On January 6, 2020, it was announced that Lind and Chicago's 18th overall selection in the 2020 NWSL College Draft were to be traded to the Houston Dash in exchange for forward Kealia Ohai.

International career
Lind started her international competition at an early age of 15. She competed with the United States under-17 women's national soccer team in international friendly, as well as with United States under-18 women's national soccer team. Lind played 4 matches at 2014 FIFA U-20 Women's World Cup. Lind was a part of the United States under-23 women's national soccer team which competed and won the 2016 Istria Cup in Croatia.

Personal life
Lind is the only child of Claire and Tom Naughton. She pursued double majors in anthropology and Spanish at Notre Dame, and was named to the Dean's list for 2012 fall semester. She was one of two team representatives to Notre Dame's Student-Athlete Advisory Council. Lind earned certificates of merit in Notre Dame's Rosenthal Leadership Academy between 2012 and 2014. She married Kevin Lind on in Chicago on December 31, 2022.

References

External links

 
 NWSL player profile
 Notre Dame player profile

1994 births
Living people
American women's soccer players
Chicago Red Stars players
Houston Dash players
Adelaide United FC (A-League Women) players
Perth Glory FC (A-League Women) players
National Women's Soccer League players
A-League Women players
Women's association football defenders
Notre Dame Fighting Irish women's soccer players
People from Elk Grove Village, Illinois
Soccer players from Illinois
Sportspeople from Cook County, Illinois
Sportspeople from DuPage County, Illinois
Expatriate women's soccer players in Australia
Chicago Red Stars draft picks
United States women's under-20 international soccer players